Chandrakala Mohan is an Indian theatre, serial and film actress, known for her works in Kannada. She received Karnataka State Film Award for Best Supporting Actress for her performance in the movie Runanubandha in 2009.

Personal life 
Chandrakala was born and brought up in Hosahalli in Mandya. She married Mohan at the age of 13 and has two children.

Career 
Chandrakala started her career as a theatre actress at the age of 10 and entered television. Her portrayal of Ajjamma in the Kannada soap Puttagowri Maduve was noted.

Chandrakala was one of the contestants in the Bigg Boss Kannada (season 8) and got evicted on the 28th day of the show.

Awards

Selected filmography 
Selected films are listed here.

References

External links 

Kannada actresses
Living people
People from Mandya district
21st-century Indian actresses
Indian actresses
Year of birth missing (living people)